Rubén Oscar Pagnanini (born 31 January 1949 in San Nicolás de los Arroyos, Buenos Aires Province) is an Argentine former football player who played for the Argentina national team.

He played for Estudiantes de La Plata, Club Atlético Independiente, Argentinos Juniors and Minnesota Kicks. Playing for Estudiantes, he won the 1969 Copa Libertadores and 1970 Copa Libertadores. His greatest achievements at the local club level were winning the Nacional championships of 1977 and 1978 with Independiente.

Pagnanini was part of the 1978 Argentina national football team that won that year's World Cup, though he did not play in any match during that tournament.

His nickname was el gato ('the cat').

In 2007, he worked as the coach of La Emilia, a club playing in the Torneo Argentino B league (4th division).

Honours

Club
 Estudiantes
Copa Libertadores: 1968, 1969, 1970
Copa Interamericana: 1968
Intercontinental Cup: 1968

 Independiente
Argentine Primera División: Nacional 1977

 Independiente
Argentine Primera División: Nacional 1978

International
 Argentina
FIFA World Cup: 1978

References

External links
 
 

1949 births
Living people
Argentine footballers
Argentine expatriate footballers
Argentina international footballers
Argentine football managers
People from San Nicolás de los Arroyos
FIFA World Cup-winning players
1978 FIFA World Cup players
Estudiantes de La Plata footballers
Club Atlético Independiente footballers
Argentinos Juniors footballers
Minnesota Kicks players
Argentine Primera División players
North American Soccer League (1968–1984) players
North American Soccer League (1968–1984) indoor players
Expatriate soccer players in the United States
Association football defenders
Argentine expatriate sportspeople in the United States
Sportspeople from Buenos Aires Province